The Suvarna Film Awards is an award ceremony for Kannada films presented annually by Star Suvarna Channel, a Kannada-language division of the STAR India, from the south-Indian state of Karnataka. The awards ceremony has been instituted to honour both artistic and technical excellence in the Kannada language film industry. Held since 2008, the awards' sponsors have been made by Ujala and Confident Group.

History and format
The Journey of Suvarna Film Awards had started in the year 2008, in order to appreciate & felicitate the Kannada Film Industry. This is the most prestigious Award given to Kannada Film Fraternities as a token of gratitude to their spectacular and outstanding contribution in the Film Industry.

It has 29 different categories of Awards of which every category of award pertains to their work, on par with excellence in various aspects of Film-making. The selection of nominees is divided into two categories which is Best & Favorite category.

The Best Category nominees are selected by a set of jury members and the Favorite category nominees are selected through the system of voting from all over Karnataka.

Jury Awards

Best Actor
The list of winners in Suvarna Film Award for Best Male Actor category.

Best Actress
The list of winners in Suvarna Film Award for Best Female Actor category.

Best Director
The list of winners in Suvarna Film Award for Best Director category.

Best Film
The list of winners in Suvarna Film Award for Best Film category.

Best Debut Actor
The list of winners in Suvarna Film Award for Best Debut Male Actor category.

Best Debut Actress
The list of winners in Suvarna Film Award for Best Debut Female Actor category.

Best Supporting Actor
The list of winners in Suvarna Film Award for Best Supporting Actor category.

Best Supporting Actress
The list of winners in Suvarna Film Award for Best Supporting Actress category.

Best Actor in Negative Role
The list of winners in Suvarna Film Award for Best Actor in Negative Role category.

Best Actor in Comedy Role
The list of winners in Suvarna Film Award for Best Actor in a Comedy Role category.

Best Music Director
The list of winners in Suvarna Film Award for Best Music Director category.

Best Lyricist
The list of winners in Suvarna Film Award for Best Lyricist category.

Best Male Playback Singer
The list of winners in Suvarna Film Award for Best Male Playback Singer category.

Best Female Playback Singer
The list of winners in Suvarna Film Award for Best Female Playback Singer category.

Best Cinematographer
The list of winners in Suvarna Film Award for Best Cinematographer category.

Best Editor
The list of winners in Suvarna Film Award for Best Editor category.

Best Choreographer
The list of winners in Suvarna Film Award for Best Choreographer category.

Best Art Director
The list of winners in Suvarna Film Award for Best Art Director category.

Best Story, Screenplay Writer
The list of winners in Suvarna Film Award for Best Story, Screenplay Writer category.

Best Makeup
The list of winners in Suvarna Film Award for Best Makeup category.

Best Costume Designer
The list of winners in Suvarna Film Award for Best Costume Designer category.

Best Stunt Director
The list of winners in Suvarna Film Award for Best Stunt Director category.

Best Dialogue Writer
The list of winners in Suvarna Film Award for Best Dialogue Writer category.

Favorite Awards

Favorite Hero
The list of winners in Suvarna Film Award for Favorite Hero category voted by audience.

Favorite Heroine
The list of winners in Suvarna Film Award for Favorite Heroine category voted by audience.

Favorite Director
The list of winners in Suvarna Film Award for Favorite Director category voted by audience.

Favorite Film
The list of winners in Suvarna Film Award for Favorite Film category voted by audience.

Favorite Song
The list of winners in Suvarna Film Award for Favorite Song category voted by audience.

Star Pair of the Year
The list of winners in Suvarna Film Award for Star Pair of the Year category.

Special awards

Contribution To Kannada Cinema
The list of winners in Suvarna Film Award for Contribution To Kannada Cinema also called as Lifetime Achievement.

Entertainer of the year
The list of winners in Suvarna Film Award for Entertainer of the year category.

Excellence in Kannada cinema
The list of winners in Suvarna Film Award for Excellence in Kannada cinema category.

Critic Award for Actor
The list of winners in Suvarna Film Award for Critic Award for Actor

Critic Award for Actress
The list of winners in Suvarna Film Award for Critic Award for Actress

Find of the year
The list of winners in Suvarna Film Award for Find of the Year category.

Special Award For Performance
The list of winners in Suvarna Film Award for Special Award For Performance category.

Mirchi Star of the Year Male
The list of winners in Suvarna Film Award for Mirchi Star of the Year Male category.

Mirchi Star of the Year Female
The list of winners in Suvarna Film Award for Mirchi Star of the Year Female category.

Glamorous Icon of the Year
The list of winners in Suvarna Film Award for Glamorous Icon of the Year category.

References

External links
 
 
 
 

Indian film awards
Kannada-language films
Lifetime achievement awards
Awards established in 2008
2008 establishments in Karnataka